In computer science, the Helman-Bader-JaJa model 
 is a concise message-passing model of parallel computation defined with the following parameters:

 is number of processors.
 is the problem size.
 is number of machine words in a packet sent over the network.
 is the latency, or time at which a processor takes to initiate a communication on a network.
 is the bandwidth, or time per machine word at which a processor can inject or receive  machine words from the network.
 is the largest computation time expended on a processor.
 is the time spent in communication on the network.

This model assumes that for any subset of  processors, a block permutation among the  processors takes  time, where  is the size of the largest block.

Analysis of common parallel algorithms 
Complexities of common parallel algorithms contained in the MPI libraries:

Point to point communication: 
Reduction :
Broadcast: 
Parallel prefix: 
All to all:

References

Parallel computing